Gravers station (formerly Graver's Lane station) is a SEPTA Regional Rail station, which is located at 300 East Gravers Lane at Anderson Street, Philadelphia, Pennsylvania. The station building is listed on the Philadelphia Register of Historic Places and the National Register.

History and architectural features
Designed by architect Furness & Evans, Gravers station was built in 1872 or 1879, according to the Philadelphia Architects and Buildings project. It was listed on the National Register of Historic Places on November 7, 1977, and was acquired by SEPTA's regional rail division in 1983.

The building combines a commuter railroad station with a residence on the second floor, and includes a range of materials and stylistic features, leading one architectural historian to call the style "histrionic."

The station is located in zone two on the Chestnut Hill East Line, along former Reading Railroad tracks, and is 10.3 track miles from Suburban Station. In 2013, this station saw 124 boardings and 125 departures on an average weekday.

Station layout

References

External links
SEPTA – Gravers Station
2000 Kevin Leary photo
 Gravers Lane entrance from Google Maps Street View
 Station House from Google Maps Street View

Philadelphia Register of Historic Places
SEPTA Regional Rail stations
Former Reading Company stations
Railway stations on the National Register of Historic Places in Philadelphia
Frank Furness buildings
Railway stations in the United States opened in 1879
Chestnut Hill, Philadelphia